The Killing Joke may refer to:


Books 
 Batman: The Killing Joke, a Batman graphic novel published in 1988
 The Killing Joke (novel), a novel by Anthony Horowitz first published in 2004

Music 
 Killing Joke, an English punk rock band formed in 1979
 Killing Joke (1980 album), their debut album
 Killing Joke (2003 album), their 2003 album

Film 
 Batman: The Killing Joke (film), a 2016 animated feature based on the 1988 graphic novel

See also
 "The Funniest Joke in the World", a Monty Python sketch
 Death from laughter